The Tift County School District is a public school district in Tift County, Georgia, United States, based in Tifton. It serves the communities of Omega, Phillipsburg, Tifton, Ty Ty, and Unionville.

Board of Education

The following people make up the Tift County Government Board of Education 

 Jonathan Jones, Chairperson - District 7   

 Pat McKinnon - District 2 - 

 Marilyn Burks, Vice Chairperson - District 1  

 John Waddell - District 3   

 Jamie Hill - District 4

 Sam Wright - District 5  

 Rusty Harrelson - District 6

Schools

The Tift County School District has a pre-K center, four primary schools, three elementary schools, two middle schools, one junior high school, one high school, and one alternative school.

In 2010, the Tift County Board of Education turned J. T. Reddick Elementary School into a 6th grade-only school.  In 2018, schools have been configured for grades K-5, 6-8 and 9–12. The new configuration will require that a new ninth grade wing be constructed at Tift County High School.

High schools
Tift County High School (9-12th grades)

Middle schools (6-8)
Eighth Street Middle School
Northeast Middle School

Elementary (K-5)
Annie Belle Clark Elementary School
Charles Spencer Elementary School
G.O Bailey Elementary School
J. T. Reddick Elementary School
Len Lastinger Elementary School
Omega Elementary School (located in Omega, K-5th grade)
Northside Primary School
Matt Wilson Elementary School

Preschools
Tift County Pre-K Center

Alternative schools
Sixth Street Academy (9-12th grade)

Gallery

References

External links
Tift County School District

School districts in Georgia (U.S. state)
Education in Tift County, Georgia
Tift County Schools